Bailey Landry (born September 25, 1995) is an American softball player for the Scrap Yard Fast Pitch. She attended East Ascension High School in Gonzales, Louisiana. She later attended Louisiana State University, where she was a two-time All-American for the LSU Tigers softball team. Landry led the Tigers to three Women's College World Series appearances in 2015, 2016 and 2017. She later went on to play professional softball with the Texas Charge of National Pro Fastpitch.

References

External links

LSU Tigers bio
USA Softball Bio

1995 births
American softball players
Living people
Softball players from Louisiana
People from Prairieville, Louisiana
LSU Tigers softball players
Scrap Yard Dawgs players